Anton Jacobs-Webb (born September 18, 2000) is a Canadian ice sledge hockey player. He competed at the 2022 Winter Paralympics in Para ice hockey, winning a silver medal. He also competed at the 2021 World Para Ice Hockey Championships, where he won another silver medal.

Early life
Jacobs-Webb was born on September 18, 2000, in Gatineau, Quebec, Canada but was raised in Williamswood, Nova Scotia. He was born with a birth defect which caused his left leg to be shorter than his right. Jacobs-Webb became interested in Para ice hockey when he met Hervé Lord as a pre-teen who then invited him to the local para hockey club in Ottawa. He had surgery to amputate his leg above the knee in 2012 and began walking with a prosthesis.

Career
Jacobs-Webb made his international debut at the 2021 World Para Ice Hockey Championships while also completing the first year of his mechanical engineering undergraduate degree at Concordia University. He helped the team qualify for the gold medal round where they lost to the United States and took home second place. Following this, Jacobs-Webb was named to Team Canada for the 2022 Winter Paralympics in Beijing. During the tournament, they again faced the United States in the gold-medal round which they lost 5–0 to earn silver.

References 

2000 births
Living people
Canadian sledge hockey players
Medalists at the 2022 Winter Paralympics
Para ice hockey players at the 2022 Winter Paralympics
Paralympic silver medalists for Canada
Paralympic medalists in sledge hockey
Paralympic sledge hockey players of Canada
Sportspeople from Gatineau